Gerald C. (Gerry) Lincoln (died November 5 or 6, 2017) was one of the founders of the Heritage Front along with Wolfgang Droege, Grant Bristow and James Scott Dawson. Lincoln was editor of Up Front, the group's official magazine, designed the group's logo and also acted as one of its spokespersons.

In 1989, Lincoln traveled with Droege and other members of the Nationalist Party of Canada to Libya on the invitation of Muammar al-Gaddafi to celebrate the twentieth anniversary of the Libyan regime. It was on that trip that several members of the Nationalist Party, disaffected by the leadership of Don Andrews, decided to found the Heritage Front.

In the 1960s, Lincoln was a fan of Jackie Shane, an openly gay, transgender, Black soul and rhythm and blues singer based in Toronto. Lincoln was an employee of A&A Records and through his contacts in the record industry, was able to convince Caravan Records to record Jackie Shane Live at the Saphire Tavern in 1967, for which he  wrote the liner notes. The album was reissued in 2015 when attention in Shane revived.

In his later years, Lincoln had ceased his political activities.

References

Canadian neo-Nazis
2017 deaths
Year of birth missing